Comic Arts Los Angeles (abbreviated as CALA or Comic Arts LA) is a comic book festival held annually in Los Angeles, California. Inaugurated in 2014 at Think Tank Gallery, the festival showcases graphic novels, comic books, and zines created by independent artists and publishers. CALA includes an artist alley-style exhibition space that features roughly 100 vendors.

History
CALA was inaugurated as a one-day event on December 6, 2014, at the Think Tank Gallery in Downtown Los Angeles, California. It is the first comic arts festival to be held in Los Angeles. Since 2015, CALA expanded from one to two days of programming, with the second day reserved for panel discussions. The 2020 event was cancelled due to the COVID-19 pandemic, and has since been on hiatus.

Event history

References

External links
 Comic Arts Los Angeles official website

Book fairs in the United States
Comics conventions in the United States
December events
Annual events in California
Recurring events established in 2014
2014 establishments in California
Conventions in California
Festivals established in 2014
Comics conventions